Szpilman is a surname and may refer to:

 Władysław Szpilman (1911–2000), Jewish Polish pianist and composer, the protagonist in The Pianist, 2002 historical drama film
 Andrzej Szpilman (born 1956), Jewish Polish dentist, composer, son of Władysław

Other 
 9973 Szpilman, main belt asteroid, named after Władysław Szpilman
 Szpilman Award, German annual art prize

See also 
 Spielmann
 Spillman

Jewish surnames
Polish-language surnames